The Dinner Detective Murder Mystery Company is a nationwide theatrical production company based within the United States. The Dinner Detective Murder Mystery Company specializes in interactive murder mystery dinner theater entertainment in both public and private show environments.  Created in 2004 by Scott and Kelly O’Brien in Culver City, CA, The Dinner Detective employs actors from The Second City, Improv Olympic, Upright Citizens Brigade and many other improvisational theater schools across the country. They perform original scripts that involve heavy audience interaction as well as a four-course sit down dinner.

History
In 2004, Scott O’Brien, the company's founder and Executive Producer, along with his wife Kelly, started a company based around the idea of forming an improvisational and updated version of the old and dated murder mystery genre.  Assembling a small group of improv actors and rewriting their own original scripts based on actual cold cases, The Dinner Detective began performing their shows in 2004 at San Gennaro Restaurant in Culver City, CA.  In 2006, with the demand for their performances growing and in an effort to promote shows outside of Culver City, the Dinner Detective Murder Mystery opened its second location in Orange County, CA.  In 2007, The Dinner Detective opened its third location in Long Beach, CA.  In January 2008 the first franchise was opened in Boulder, CO.  Since 2009 over 80 locations have been opened nationwide.

Framework
The Dinner Detective has its corporate offices located in Colorado.  All of the individual locations hire and train local actors to perform in their public/private performances.  Through its original and proprietary franchised system, The Dinner Detective has established offices in over 80 cities throughout the United States.

Public shows
Public shows are mainly held inside hotels, but they can also take place in a variety of other venues including restaurants, banquet/conference facilities, and theatres. Shows last about 3 hours during which the audience experiences a multi-act interactive murder mystery while being served a plated three to four-course meal.

Private shows
The Dinner Detective also offers customized private parties for both large and small groups. Private shows are held at an establishment of the customer's choice or at one of the 80+ locations nationwide.  Typical events are corporate awards banquets, team building, employee recognition, birthdays, engagement parties, and family reunions.

See also
 List of dinner theaters

References

Dinner theatre
Companies based in Colorado
Theatre in the United States